Martin Walsh is an Australian film and documentary writer and producer.

Career
Walsh began his professional career working as an actor and he served in 2 Commando Company, 1st Commando Regiment. He then moved into marketing management and digital transformation and later began writing and producing documentaries and films. He founded Red Dune Films in 2005.

Walsh co-wrote and co-produced the 2006 The Battle of Long Tan narrated by Sam Worthington which won the 2007 Australian Subscription Television and Radio Association Award for Most Outstanding Documentary. He produced the upcoming 2019 feature film Danger Close: The Battle of Long Tan starring Travis Fimmel.

Filmography 
 The Battle of Long Tan (2006) – documentary; co-written and co-produced by Walsh
Danger Close: The Battle of Long Tan (2019) – feature film; produced by Walsh

References

External links

 Red Dune Films

Australian film producers
Year of birth missing (living people)
Living people